FCW may refer to:

Professional wrestling 
 Championship Wrestling from Florida, also referred to as Florida Championship Wrestling, operating from 1949 until 1987 
 Florida Championship Wrestling, operating from 2007 until 2012
FCW (TV series), the television show for Florida Championship Wrestling

Football clubs 
 FC Wacker Innsbruck (2002), in Innsbruck, Austria
 FC Wil, in Wil, St. Gallen, Switzerland
 FC Winterthur, in Winterthur, Switzerland
 FC Wohlen, in Wohlen, Aargau, Switzerland

Other uses 
 City West railway station's station code, in Perth, Western Australia
 Falconcity of Wonders, a Dubai-based real estate project
 Federal Computer Week, an American technology magazine
 Finnish Civil War, a conflict in 1918
 Forward collision warning, an automobile safety system
 First Commonwealth, a subsidiary of The Guardian Life Insurance Company of America